Parkway Gardens Apartment Homes, also known as O'Block, or WIIIC City, is a privately-owned low-income apartment complex located on the border of Woodlawn and Washington Park. Chicago’s Woodlawn and Washington Park community areas are located on the South Side of Chicago, Illinois. The complex was built from 1950 to 1955; architect Henry K. Holsman, who planned several of Chicago's affordable housing developments, designed the Modernist buildings. 

The apartment complex was the first to be cooperatively owned by Chicago's African-American residents, who experienced a housing shortage during the Second Great Migration due to segregation; early residents included former First Lady Michelle Obama, and more recent inhabitants have included rappers Chief Keef and King Von. 

Many other notable artists and music producers have come from Parkway Gardens as well. In recent years, however, the complex has become the center of one of Chicago's most violent blocks. The complex is listed on the National Register of Historic Places.

History
Parkway Gardens Apartment Homes, built from 1950 to 1955, was the last of Henry K. Holsman's many housing development designs in Chicago. Holsman began designing low-income housing in Chicago in the 1910s when an urban housing shortage developed after World War I. He worked on several of the Chicago Housing Authority's major housing projects in the 1930s; later in the decade, he began developing his own projects with funding from the Federal Housing Authority. From the 1940s onward, Holsman focused on designing residences for Chicago's African-American citizens, such as his Princeton Park community.

While Chicago's African-American population boomed from 1920 to 1970 due to the Great Migrations, discriminatory housing policies forced African-Americans to live in the "Black Belt" section of the city's South Side, which did not have enough housing to meet demands. After completing the Winchester-Hood and Lunt-Lake Apartments on the North Side, Holsman began work on the similarly designed Parkway Gardens as a return to the South Side African-American community. The complex replaced the White City Amusement Park, which had operated at the site since 1905. Holsman's firm went bankrupt before the complex opened due to unsound financial decisions, one of which resulted in Holsman's conviction for mail fraud.

The complex was the first cooperatively owned African-American housing development in the United States. While Holsman had worked on cooperative housing in the past, its adoption by African-Americans was considered a major success for the community. Mary McLeod Bethune gave an address at the development's cornerstone-laying ceremony, which was attended by Governor Adlai Stevenson II, Chicago Mayor Martin H. Kennelly, and both of the state's U.S. Senators. Advocates for affordable housing and civil rights praised the development when it was completed, citing its modern heating and appliances and its expansive units. The complex attracted African-American residents from lower-income backgrounds, including future First Lady Michelle Obama's family, who lived there at the time of her birth.
Parkway Gardens shifted from cooperative ownership to HUD management in the 1970s and to private ownership in the 1980s. Following the change in ownership, the property deteriorated because of a lack of investment in modernization and maintenance.

The Chicago affiliate of national real estate firm Related Companies and a major affordable housing and mixed-use developer known for its expertise in preservation projects purchased Parkway Gardens in 2011. The company completed a significant renovation of the property in September 2013, preserving a site with historical significance and providing an affordable place for 2,000 people to live. This renovation of Parkway Gardens received the 2014 Chicago Neighborhood Development Award for Outstanding For-Profit Neighborhood Real Estate Project from the Local Initiatives Support Corporation Chicago.

Gang activity
Since the late 2000s, Parkway has been the center of gang shootings mostly amongst teenagers and young adults. Tenants of Parkway and community leaders contested the crime wave came after CHA demolished the drug-infested Randolph Towers, nicknamed the "Calumet Building" which was once located at 6217 S. Calumet Ave. The 16-story red-brick project building was the base of operations for the Black Disciples gang. In a 2004 Chicago Tribune article it was stated drug dealers in the Randolph Towers were hauling in drug profits as much as $300,000 per day. After the demolition of Randolph Towers in 2006, Black Disciples then shifted their operations to Parkway Gardens which was at the time affordable housing for low-income families and had become Gangster Disciples territory. 
In the early 2010s, gang activity skyrocketed and Parkway Gardens became the center of one of Chicago's most violent blocks. The 6400 block of South King Drive was known locally as "WIIIC CITY", but is now referred to as "O-Block", named in memory of murdered resident Odee Perry. Under this name, it has become nationally notorious due to former Parkway Gardens residents Chief Keef and King Von, whose music often references O-Block and its violence.
Between June 2011 and June 2014, O-Block had the most shootings of any block in Chicago. Many of these shootings occurred in 2011 and 2012, with city police reporting that violence at the complex has since steadily declined. The violence stems mainly from gang rivalries between the Gangster Disciples and Black Disciples, who both control territory near the block.

The complex was added to the National Register of Historic Places on November 22, 2011, for its architectural significance and its role in African-American community development.

Architecture
Holsman gave the Parkway Gardens Apartment Homes a Modernist design inspired by European housing projects of the 1920s and 1930s. The complex is low-rise and includes several walk-up buildings, giving it a personal feel at a time when skyscraper housing projects were common. Thirty-five buildings are included in the complex; twenty-four of these are walk-up buildings, while the remaining eleven are eight-story buildings. The development's layout emphasized spaciousness, light, and airflow and pointed entrances toward the inside of the complex rather than the street. Instead of ornamentation, angled bays gave variety to the exteriors, a feature inspired by German "zig-zag houses". The few decorative elements, which include cantilevered balconies and ribbon windows, are typical of Modernist buildings.

References

Apartment buildings in Chicago
Residential buildings on the National Register of Historic Places in Chicago
Modernist architecture in Illinois
African-American history in Chicago